Clap is a 2022 Indian sports drama film directed by debutant Prithivi Adithya. It is shot simultaneously in Tamil and Telugu languages. The film stars Aadhi Pinisetty and Aakanksha Singh with a supporting cast including Nassar, Prakash Raj, Krisha Kurup, Brahmaji, Mime Gopi and Munishkanth. The film's soundtrack and background score is composed by Ilaiyaraaja, with cinematography handled by Praveen Kumar and editing done by Ragul. The film was released via OTT platform SonyLIV on 11 March 2022.

Synopsis
A former athlete and an amputee with a special condition called PLP ( Phantom limp Pain) picks up a girl from a village to train for national championship event. How he wins his dream through the girl is the plot.

Cast

Soundtrack
The soundtrack and score is composed by Ilaiyaraaja and the album featured one song. The audio rights were acquired by Lahari Music.

Clap (Tamil)

Clap (Telugu)

Reception 
Logesh Balachandran critic from Times of india gave 2.5 stars out of 5 stars and noted that "Overall, Clap is an average sports drama which can be your dose of motivation for the weekend." Indiaherald Critic gave mixture of review ,Mention that "Aadhi scores but rest fails ". Navein Darshan from Cinema express noted that  "Aadhi shines in a memorable sports drama "

References

External links 
 

Films about amputees
Films not released in theaters due to the COVID-19 pandemic
Films scored by Ilaiyaraaja
Indian direct-to-video films
2020s sports drama films
Indian sports drama films
Indian multilingual films
2020s Telugu-language films
2020s Tamil-language films
2022 directorial debut films
2022 multilingual films
2022 drama films
2022 films